Charles "Charl" Bouwer (born 27 March 1990) is a paralympic swimmer from South Africa competing in category S13 events. He was born in Kimberley.

Swimming career

Paralympics
At the 2004 Summer Paralympics he competed in the 100m backstroke, 200m individual medley and 400m freestyle.

At the 2008 Summer Paralympics he competed in S13 100m butterfly, 400m freestyle, 100m freestyle, 100m backstroke, 50m freestyle. He won gold and set a new world record in the 400m freestyle.

At the 2012 Summer Paralympics he participated in the S13 class Men's 50m, 100m and 400m freestyle; 100m butterfly; 100m backstroke and the SM13 Men's 200m individual medley. He won gold in the 50m freestyle.

References

External links
 

1990 births
Living people
South African male freestyle swimmers
S13-classified Paralympic swimmers
Paralympic swimmers of South Africa
Paralympic gold medalists for South Africa
Paralympic silver medalists for South Africa
Paralympic medalists in swimming
Swimmers at the 2004 Summer Paralympics
Swimmers at the 2008 Summer Paralympics
Swimmers at the 2012 Summer Paralympics
Medalists at the 2008 Summer Paralympics
Medalists at the 2012 Summer Paralympics
Sportspeople from Kimberley, Northern Cape
21st-century South African people
20th-century South African people